Deene is a small village and civil parish near Deenethorpe  and Bulwick in North Northamptonshire. It has a village hall, and notable buildings include the redundant St Peter's Church, and the manor of Deene Park.

The villages name means 'Valley'.

References

External links

Villages in Northamptonshire
North Northamptonshire
Civil parishes in Northamptonshire